Joseph Barsky (Odessa, Russian Empire – 1943 in Haifa, Palestine) was an architect in Ottoman and Mandatory Palestine. 

Barsky was a graduate of the Architectural College in Grekov Odessa Art school of Odessa and the St. Petersburg Imperial Academy of Art. He came to Ottoman Palestine in 1907 and from that time on lived and worked in Jerusalem. He was one of the most renowned representatives of the Zionist architects of the Eretz Yisrael style.

Notable buildings
 Herzliya Hebrew High School, Tel Aviv (destroyed in 1962) 
 The first kiosk in Tel Aviv at the middle of the Rothschild Boulevard
 Bikur Cholim Hospital, Jerusalem
 Diskin Orphanage, Jerusalem

References

Architects in Ottoman Palestine
Architects in Mandatory Palestine
Jewish architects
1943 deaths
Year of birth missing
Emigrants from the Russian Empire to the Ottoman Empire